From There to Here (TC: 一路走來) is a Cantopop EP by Edmond Leung.

Track listing
 "From There To Here" (一路走來)
 "The Leading Role" (主角一號)
 "Broke Up For A While" (暫時分開)
 "Back To The Origin" (回到當初)

Charts

References

Edmond Leung albums
2015 EPs
Cantonese-language albums